Sant Kumar is an Indian Olympic middle-distance runner. He represented his country in the men's 1500 meters at the 1980 Summer Olympics. His time was a 3:55.60.

Colonel Sant Kumar represented India in 1,500m at the Moscow Olympics. He was a bronze medallist in 1500m at the Asian Games at Bangkok, Thailand.
Early life
Done his schooling from sainik school kunjpura after 12th clear nda exam and joined national defense academy khadagwasala pune

References

External links
 

1959 births
Living people
Indian male middle-distance runners
Olympic athletes of India
Athletes (track and field) at the 1980 Summer Olympics